The 1977 Virginia Slims of Houston  was a women's tennis tournament played on indoor carpet courts at the Astro Arena in Houston, Texas in the United States that was part of the 1977 Virginia Slims World Championship Series. It was the seventh edition of the tournament and was held from January 17 through January 23, 1977. First-seeded Martina Navratilova won the singles title and earned $20,000 first-prize money.

Finals

Singles
 Martina Navratilova defeated  Sue Barker 7–6(5–3), 7–5

Doubles
 Martina Navratilova /  Betty Stöve defeated  Sue Barker /  Ann Kiyomura 4–6, 6–2, 6–1

Prize money

References

External links
 ITF tournament edition details

Virginia Slims of Houston
Virginia Slims of Houston
Virginia Slims of Houston
Virginia Slims of Houston
Virginia Slims of Houston
Virginia Slims of Houston